Brundall Gardens railway station is on the Wherry Lines in the East of England, serving the western side of the village of Brundall, Norfolk. Its three-letter station code is BGA.

The station was opened in 1924. Today it is managed and served by Greater Anglia.

History
A station at Brundall Gardens, initially known as Brundall Gardens Halt, was opened on 1 August 1924, 80 years after the opening of the line. This was in response to an increasing level of tourism to the lakes and waterways close to the station.

Services
 the typical Monday-Saturday off-peak service at Brundall Gardens is as follows:

On Mondays to Saturdays, two Norwich to Lowestoft trains also stop at Brundall Gardens during the morning peak. Additionally, the second of the two daily stopping services to Great Yarmouth via Reedham also calls here. Conversely, the last train of the day to Great Yarmouth via Acle does not stop at Brundall Gardens.

On Sundays, there are eight trains a day in both directions, serving the station every two hours. The last Up train of the day is from Great Yarmouth via Reedham; all other services are via Acle.

New trains were introduced on the route in summer 2019 to replace the Class 153 and Class 156 Super Sprinters and Class 170 Turbostar diesel multiple units.

References

External links 

Railway stations in Norfolk
DfT Category F2 stations
Former London and North Eastern Railway stations
Railway stations in Great Britain opened in 1924
Greater Anglia franchise railway stations